Chaim-Dovid Saracik is an Orthodox Jewish Chasidish musician who lives in the Old City of Jerusalem.  He professionally goes by the name Chaim Dovid.  He has produced more than eleven albums and has played for thousands of people over the past couple of decades.

Background
Saracik was born and raised in South Africa and began playing guitar at the age of 11.  He served in the South African military.  In the 1970s he spent time in Israel volunteering as a gardener on kibbutz "Ramat Hakovesh".  After his volunteer work in Israel, he traveled to Europe.

Saracik met Rabbi Shlomo Carlebach at a concert in Amsterdam and first performed with him in London a few months later.  In 1975 he arrived at the Diaspora Yeshiva in Jerusalem, Israel.

Saracik lives in the Old City of Jerusalem.  His parents lived their last years in Australia.

Musical style
Saracik's music is heavily influenced by Shlomo Carlebach.  He is a regular at the Safed summer klezmer festivals.
He is famous for his niggun "Yamamai"

Discography
Ohr Chadash (1986)
Open Up Your Gates (1988)
Songs for Your Shabbos Table (for Aish Hatorah) (1988)
Lema'an Shemo ...For the Sake of His Name (1991)
Hayom ...On This Day (1993)
Before You - Lefanecha (1998)
Grateful ... And Alive! (Live from the Carlebach Shul) (1999)
With the Chassidim (2000)
Mi'tzur Dvash (2001)
Ma'aser Rishon (2003)
First Fruits (compilation of 'Ohr Chadash' & 'Open Up Your Gates') (2004)
Bnei Baischo - Build Your Home (songs of Eliyahu Hartman) (2005)
Chaim David and the Good News Bearers (2009)

References

External links
  breslev.co.il - An interview with Chaim Dovid
 Carrying On The Carlebach Legacy
 The joy of holiness, and the holiness of joy
   Chaim Dovid on LinkedIn
  Chaim Dovid on FaceBook

Jewish Israeli musicians
Jewish songwriters
South African emigrants to Israel
South African Jews
Israeli Jews
Living people
 
Jewish folk singers
Year of birth missing (living people)